The 2010 UCI Women's Road World Cup is the 13th edition of the UCI Women's Road World Cup. Although using most of the same races as the 2009 edition, there are some changes. The Tour de Berne has been dropped and replaced with the introduction of the new Tour of Chongming Island World Cup (which stands alongside the Tour of Chongming Island stage race and Tour of Chongming Island Time Trial) to World Cup status. Also new to the calendar is the GP Ciudad de Valladolid. The Montréal World Cup was originally planned for a late May slot, but later cancelled due to a loss of sponsorship. The Rund um die Nürnberger Altstadt was planned as the season finale, but was later downgraded to non-UCI status. Marianne Vos won the series, leading from the first round through to the finish. By winning two races, Emma Pooley won the most races.

Races
Source:

Final ranking
Source:

References

External links
Official site

 
UCI Women's Road World Cup
UCI Women's Road World Cup